There were a number of Axis prisoner-of-war camps in Italy during World War II. The initials "P.G." denote Prigione di Guerra (Prison of War), often interchanged with the title Campo (field or military camp). The Italian Armistice, declared on 8 September 1943, ended the Italian administration of the camps, many of which in the Italian Social Republic of northern and central Italy were resecured by the Germans and used to hold new prisoners and recaptured escapees.

List of POW camps

In film
 Von Ryan's Express

References

Further reading

Useful POW websites

Other publications
  (Foreword by Winston Churchill)

 
 

  
  (Contains a sketch map of Castello Vincigliata, route of capture, and escape route : Sidi Azir to London).
 
  (Tells of the authors' experiences as a prisoner of the Italians during WWII).
  (Book of his WW2 prisoner-of-war experiences).
  (Written whilst a POW, a narrative of Vincigliata as Camp P.G. 12, contains a scale plan of Castello di Vincigliata, and photographs taken by the author just after the war).
 
 
  - includes a list of some basic information about some of the camps already listed, by Brian Sims, and a drawn plan of Camp 49 Fontanellato, showing an escape route
 

 Italy
Italy

POW
Pow